Nevta (also known as Neota, in hindi नेवटा ) Dam is located in Sanganer Tehsil of Jaipur district in Rajasthan, India.

See also 
List of Dams and Reservoirs in India

References 

Dams in Rajasthan
Jaipur district
Tourist attractions in Jaipur district